Vladimír Popelka (born 14 October 1948) is a Czech former cyclist. He competed in the tandem event at the 1972 Summer Olympics.

References

External links
 

1948 births
Living people
Czech male cyclists
Olympic cyclists of Czechoslovakia
Cyclists at the 1972 Summer Olympics
People from Litomyšl
Sportspeople from the Pardubice Region